Eldorado (Xiririca before 1948) is a municipality in the state of São Paulo in Brazil. The population is 15,544 (2020 est.) in an area of 1654 km2. Eldorado is one of 29 cities in São Paulo officially recognized as a touristic city, which gives it extra funding.

Geography
Eldorado is situated on the Ribeira de Iguape River. The state highways SP-165 and SP-193 pass through the town.

The municipality contains part of the  Serra do Mar Environmental Protection Area, created in 1984.
It contains part of the  Intervales State Park, created in 1995.
It contains part of the  Caverna do Diabo State Park, created in 2008.
This park contains the largest cave in São Paulo, Caverna do Diabo (The Devil's Cave).
The municipality contains 41% of the  Quilombos do Médio Ribeira Environmental Protection Area, established in 2008.

People

Demographics 

Census - 2000

Total Population: 14,134
 Urban: 6,974
 Rural: 7,160
 Male: 7,337
 Female: 6,797
Density (inhabitants/km2): 8.53

Infant Mortality (per 1000): 19.12

Life Expectancy: 69.57

Birth Rate: 3.50

Literacy Rate: 85.65%

Human Development Index (HDI-M): 0.733
 HDI-M Income: 0.633
 HDI-M Longevity: 0.743
 HDI-M Education: 0.823
(Source: IPEADATA)

Notable people 
 Jair Bolsonaro, Brazilian President since 1 January 2019, anti-communist and conservative, known for supporting the Brazilian military government that lasted from 1964 to 1984.
 Francisca Júlia da Silva, Brazilian poet born in Eldorado on 31 August 1871.

References

External links 
 Página da prefeitura - In Portuguese

Municipalities in São Paulo (state)